Beek is a hamlet in the Dutch province of Limburg. It is located in the municipality Venray, about 3 km northwest of the center of that town.

Beek is not a statistical entity, and the postal authorities have placed it under . It has no place name signs, and consists of about 25 houses.

References

Populated places in Limburg (Netherlands)
Venray